Kingston is a village and a census-designated place within the town of South Kingstown in Washington County, Rhode Island, United States, and the site of the main campus of the University of Rhode Island. The population was 6,974 at the 2010 census. Much of the village center is listed on the National Register of Historic Places as Kingston Village Historic District. It was originally known as Little Rest.

History

Kingston was first settled in the late seventeenth century.   Originally known as Little Rest, the name was changed to Kingston in 1826. It was the county seat for Washington County (formerly Kings County) from 1752 until 1894, when a new courthouse was built in nearby West Kingston.  West Kingston is also the site of the historic Kingston Railroad Station which opened in June, 1875. The station is served by Amtrak on its Northeast Corridor.

For a time, starting in the late 1770s, the preacher Jemima Wilkinson, known as the Public Universal Friend resided and gave sermons in the town. As late as the 1900s inhabitants of Kingston called a species of solidago "Jemima weed", because its appearance in the town coincided with the preacher's first visit to the area.

South Kingstown established the Kingston Historic District in 1959, and much of Kingston village became a National Register historic district in 1974 as Kingston Village Historic District. The historic district is located just outside the campus of the University of Rhode Island and contains many fine examples of 18th and 19th century architecture. The historic district includes 38 buildings.

The University of Rhode Island was established at Kingston in 1888 as the Rhode Island Agricultural School and Agricultural Experiment Station, by funding from the Hatch Act of 1887.  In 1892 the Agricultural School became the Rhode Island College of Agriculture and Mechanic Arts with funding from the Second Morrill Land Grant Act of 1890, later becoming Rhode Island State College in 1909 and the University of Rhode Island in 1951.

Economy
In addition to the university, major businesses in Kingston include APC by Schneider Electric and the Arnold Lumber Company.

Education
Public schools are operated by the South Kingstown School District. Educational institutions in Kingston include:
 The Compass School, a public K-8 charter school
 Kingston Hill Academy, a public K-5 charter school
 University of Rhode Island
 Gordon Research Conferences center

Houses of worship
Religious denominations represented with churches, mosques, and synagogues in Kingston or on the university campus are Roman Catholicism, the United Church of Christ, Episcopalians, United Methodists, Baptists, Islam, and Judaism.

Geography
According to the United States Census Bureau, the CDP has a total area of 1.563 square miles (4.05 km), of which 1.556 square miles (4.03 km) is land and 0.007 square miles (0.02 km) (0.45%) is water.

Climate

Demographics

Nearby populated areas
 Wakefield, Rhode Island (3 miles)
 Peace Dale, Rhode Island (3 miles)
 Narragansett, Rhode Island (5 miles)

See also
 George Fayerweather Blacksmith Shop
 Great Swamp Fight
 Kingston (Amtrak station)
 South County History Center
  Tavern Hall Preservation Society/Elisha Reynolds House (1738)
 Tootell House
 Washington County Courthouse
 National Register of Historic Places listings in Washington County, Rhode Island

References

Further reading
Images of America: Kingston by Betty J. Cotter. Charleston, SC: Arcadia Publishing, c. 1999 
Lost South Kingstown : with a history of ten of its early villages by Kathleen Bossy and Mary Keane. Kingston, R.I. : Pettaquamscutt Historical Society, c. 2004
A History of Kingston, R.I. 1700 – 1900: Heart of Rural South County by Christian M.  McBurney. Kingston, R.I. : The Pettaquamscutt Historical Society, c. 2004

External links

Town of South Kingstown, Rhode Island

Villages in Washington County, Rhode Island
South Kingstown, Rhode Island
Census-designated places in Washington County, Rhode Island
Providence metropolitan area
Villages in Rhode Island
Census-designated places in Rhode Island